Megino-Aldan (Meŋe Aldan) is a rural locality (a selo), the only inhabited locality, and the administrative center of Megino-Aldansky Rural Okrug of Tomponsky District in the Sakha Republic, Russia, located  from Khandyga, the administrative center of the district. Its population as of the 2010 Census was 1,020, down from 1,075 recorded during the 2002 Census. It is located by the Aldan, opposite the mouth of the Tompo.

References

Notes

Sources
Official website of the Sakha Republic. Registry of the Administrative-Territorial Divisions of the Sakha Republic. Tomponsky District. 

Rural localities in Tomponsky District
Central Yakutian Lowland